Michael Fox is an American politician currently serving in the Montana Senate from Montana's 16th district. He was elected to the seat after incumbent Democrat Frank Smith decided to run for a seat in the Montana House of Representatives instead of reelection. He defeated several Democratic candidates in the primary election, advancing to and winning the general election by default.

References

Living people
21st-century American politicians
Democratic Party Montana state senators
Year of birth missing (living people)